Lydia Hiernickel (born 23 December 1996) is a Swiss cross-country skier. She competed in the women's 10 kilometre freestyle at the 2018 Winter Olympics.

Cross-country skiing results
All results are sourced from the International Ski Federation (FIS).

Olympic Games

World Championships

World Cup

Season standings

References

External links
 

1996 births
Living people
Swiss female cross-country skiers
Olympic cross-country skiers of Switzerland
Cross-country skiers at the 2018 Winter Olympics
Place of birth missing (living people)
Cross-country skiers at the 2022 Winter Olympics
21st-century Swiss women